Major ministry may refer to:

 First Major ministry, the British majority government led by John Major from 1990 to 1992
 Second Major ministry, the British majority (later minority) government led by John Major from 1992 to 1997

See also
 Premiership of John Major
 Shadow Cabinet of John Major